Stewart Ferguson (January 27, 1900 – December 29, 1955) was an American football and basketball coach. He served as the head football coach at Dakota Wesleyan University in Mitchell, South Dakota from 1929 to 1933 and at Arkansas Agricultural and Mechanical College—now known as the University of Arkansas–Monticello—in 1934 and from 1938 to 1941, compiling a career college football coaching record of 20–69–2. As a college football coach, he was credited with inventing the Swinging gate formation. Ferguson was also the head basketball coach at Dakota Wesleyan from 1929 to 1934, tallying a mark of 65–17.

A native of Carthage, Missouri, Ferguson played college football at Dakota Wesleyan, starting as an end on teams coached by Bud Daugherty. He died of a heart attack, on December 29, 1955, in Deadwood, South Dakota.

Ferguson was humorously profiled by Frank X. Tolbert in his collection, Tolbert's Texas.

Head coaching record

College football

Basketball

References

1900 births
1955 deaths
American football ends
Arkansas–Monticello Boll Weevils and Cotton Blossoms athletic directors
Arkansas–Monticello Boll Weevils football coaches
Basketball coaches from Missouri
Dakota Wesleyan Tigers athletic directors
Dakota Wesleyan Tigers football coaches
Dakota Wesleyan Tigers football players
Dakota Wesleyan Tigers men's basketball coaches
High school football coaches in South Dakota
Louisiana State University alumni
People from Carthage, Missouri
Players of American football from Missouri